Voyageur Colonial Bus Lines, commonly called Voyageur Colonial or just Voyageur, was a Canadian intercity bus company that serves Eastern Ontario and Western Quebec, primarily the cities of Montreal, Ottawa and Kingston, Toronto.  It has been owned by Greyhound since 1998, and the Voyageur brand has essentially disappeared as Greyhound has renewed its fleet.

History

Voyageur Colonial Limited was incorporated on January 7, 1928, as Colonial Coach Lines Ltd., which ran buses between Renfrew, Ottawa, Morrisburg and Kingston, Ontario. In 1930 Colonial was purchased by the Provincial Transport Company (la Compagnie de Transport-Provincial), which had been incorporated in November 1928 and acquired 31 bus lines in the Montreal area in June 1929. Colonial expanded during the 1930s and 1940s, acquiring many other operators, including the Toronto–Montreal Road Coach Line, the J. Gill Bus Line, Collacutt Coach Lines, Kawartha Lakes Coach Lines and Pony Bus Lines Ltd.

In Quebec, Provincial was affiliated with the Montreal Tramways Company until 1948. Operations included intercity bus service throughout the province and transit operations (through subsidiaries) in Sherbrooke, Quebec City, Kingston and elsewhere. In 1969, after 40 years of operation, all of Provincial Transport Enterprises' subsidiaries were unified under the Voyageur name. At the same time, Colonial Coach Lines was renamed Voyageur Colonial Ltd.

At various times Voyageur operated a number of subsidiaries, including Voyageur Abitibi (based in Val d'Or), Voyageur Inc., Voyageur Provincial (both headquartered in Montréal) and Voyageur Quebec. By 1981 the company was owned by Canada Steamship Lines Inc., 50% owned by Paul Martin's family. The Quebec routes were sold to other operators over the following decade, and in 1994 Greyhound purchased key Ottawa and Toronto routes from Voyageur. In 1998 CSL sold Voyageur to Greyhound Canada, which in turn is owned by the UK-based FirstGroup.

See also
 Gare d'autocars de Montréal
 Greyhound Canada
 Kingston Bus Terminal
 Ottawa Central Station

References

External links
 Greyhound Canada
 Greyhound Canada - historical timeline
 Voyageur fleet listing

Transport companies established in 1928
FirstGroup companies
Bus transport in Ontario
Bus transport in Quebec
Companies based in Montreal
Defunct intercity bus companies of Canada
1928 establishments in Ontario
Canadian companies established in 1928